Metallosticha is a genus of snout moths described by Hans Rebel in 1901.

Species
 Metallosticha aigneri (Amsel, 1935)
 Metallosticha argyrogrammos Zeller, 1847
 Metallosticha pamphaes (Turner, 1904)
 Metallosticha plumbeifasciella (Hampson, 1996)

References

Phycitini
Pyralidae genera